J. B. Allen House is a historic residence in Chestnut Grove, Kentucky, United States, that is listed on the National Register of Historic Places.

Description

The house is a two-story brick T-plan that was built in the 1870s.  It was built with brick in running bond on its principal (southeast) facade, and has segmental arched brick hood molds over its 2/2 sash windows. It had a cornice, but that was removed. It has a "handsome" one-story wood porch with paired columns and jig-sawn trim.  It has a hipped roof. The house has a one-and-a-half-story ell and a shed-roofed porch in the angle of the ell. It has a separate underground cellar.

It was listed on the National Register of Historic Places December 27, 1988.

See also

 National Register of Historic Places listings in Shelby County, Kentucky

References

External links

National Register of Historic Places in Shelby County, Kentucky
Houses completed in 1875
Houses in Shelby County, Kentucky
Houses on the National Register of Historic Places in Kentucky
1875 establishments in Kentucky